Mister Moses is a 1965 American adventure film about a con man blackmailed into persuading an entire African village into relocating for their own safety. It was directed by Ronald Neame and stars Robert Mitchum and Carroll Baker. The film was based on the 1961 novel of the same name by Max Catto. It was filmed on location in Kenya, at Lake Naivasha and the Amboseli National Park.

Plot
Beaten and expelled by African villagers for trying to cheat them, the unconscious Joe Moses drifts down a river, where he is discovered by the natives of another village. This tribe is being pressured to move by the District Officer (Ian Bannen), as their land will be flooded by the release of waters from a dam; but they refuse to leave their homes. Deeply Christian, the villagers compare Joe Moses to the real Moses due to his discovery in the reeds as was the baby Moses. With a broken leg and no money, Joe Moses is trapped in the village.

Nursed to health by missionary Rev. Anderson (Alexander Knox) and his daughter Julie (Carrol Baker), Moses impresses the natives with his medicine show. He further astounds the locals when he discovers Emily, that he recognizes as an Indian elephant, in the village. Moses gets her to respond to commands in Hindustani, a language he acquired through his army service in the China Burma India theatre.

The Chief (Orlando Martins) agrees to allow his people to move, but only if they are led by Moses.  Reverend Anderson and Julie blackmail Moses through their knowledge of his diamond smuggling in order to lead the people to the "Promised Land". Seeing through Moses's confidence tricks is an educated African, Ubi (Raymond St. Jacques). Ubi initially wishes to team up with Moses to con other Africans, but then attempts to steal Moses's show with a concealed flame thrower that has unexpectedly disastrous consequences for Ubi.

Leading the villagers from atop his elephant, Moses takes them on a journey that has many parallels with the biblical trek, including a bit where he has to part the waters by entering the dam.

Cast
Robert Mitchum as Joe Moses
Carroll Baker as Julie Anderson
Ian Bannen as Robert
Alexander Knox as Rev. Anderson
Raymond St. Jacques as Ubi
Orlando Martins as Chief
Reginald Beckwith as Parkhurst

Production
Max Catto's novel was published in 1961. Film rights were purchased that year by Frank Ross for $310,000. Ross announced he would make it for United Artists at a budget of $6.5 million. It was the seventh time Catto had sold a novel to the movies.

Reception
The New York Times reviewer A. H. Weiler was unimpressed, writing that it "strains credibility and rarely excites a viewer."

See also
List of American films of 1965

Notes

External links

1965 films
1965 adventure films
American adventure films
Films about con artists
Films based on British novels
Films directed by Ronald Neame
Films set in Kenya
Films shot in Kenya
Films scored by John Barry (composer)
United Artists films
Films with screenplays by Charles Beaumont
Films about elephants
1960s English-language films
1960s American films